Abdul Omar (born 3 October 1993) is a Ghanaian boxer. He competed in the men's bantamweight event at the 2016 Summer Olympics, where he was defeated by Alberto Melián in the first round.

References

External links
 
 

1993 births
Living people
Ghanaian male boxers
Olympic boxers of Ghana
Boxers at the 2016 Summer Olympics
Place of birth missing (living people)
Boxers at the 2014 Commonwealth Games
Commonwealth Games medallists in boxing
Commonwealth Games bronze medallists for Ghana
Bantamweight boxers
Flyweight boxers
Boxers at the 2022 Commonwealth Games
Light-welterweight boxers
Medallists at the 2014 Commonwealth Games
Medallists at the 2022 Commonwealth Games